Federal Office of Statistics may refer to:

 Federal Statistical Office (Switzerland)
 Federal Office of Statistics (Bosnia and Herzegovina)
 Federal Office of Statistics (Nigeria), now National Bureau of Statistics of Nigeria

See also
 National Bureau of Statistics (disambiguation)